Gravia is a village and a former municipality in the northeastern part of Phocis, Greece. Since the 2011 local government reform it is part of the municipality Delphi, of which it is a municipal unit. The municipal unit has an area of 161.651 km2. In the 2011 census its population was 604 for the village and 2,073 for the municipality.

Location
The municipal unit Gravia is situated in the foothills of the mountains Giona and Parnassus. The northeastern part of the municipal unit covers the western end of the wide valley of the river Cephissus. There are farmlands in the valley. The municipal unit borders Phthiotis Prefecture to the north and northeast. The Greek National Road 27 connects Gravia with Itea, Amfissa and Lamia. Gravia is located south of Lamia, northwest of Livadia and north of Amfissa and Itea.

History
The name is of Slavic origin, pointing to a settlement of the area after the 6th century; initially it was the name of a local river (mod. Koukouvistianos), which was later transferred to a castle some 5 km northwest of the modern settlement, above the acropolis of the ancient settlement of Pindus. The castle was most likely built by the Crusaders in the early 13th century, being mentioned for the first time in 1259, when the Prince of Achaea William II of Villehardouin crossed the local pass on his way to the Battle of Pelagonia. In 1275 it was one of the castles ceded by the ruler of Thessaly, John I Doukas, to the Duchy of Athens, as the dowry of his daughter Helena Angelina Komnene. The castle's history is unknown thereafter, except for a brief mention in 1304.

Gravia is famous for the battle of the Gravia Inn, that took place during the Greek Revolution of 1821. Odysseas Androutsos along with a group of Greek soldiers successfully repelled an attack from the Turkish army led by Omer Vryonis in May 1821.

Municipal districts

Apostolias
Gravia
Kaloskopi
Kastellia
Mariolata
Oinochori
Sklithro
Vargiani

Population

Sporting clubs
Androutsos Gravia

See also
List of settlements in Boeotia

References

Sources

External links 

Official website of the municipality of Gravia
 Gravia on the GTP Travel Pages

Populated places in Phocis
Castles in Greece